The 2014 Pac-12 Conference football season was the fourth season of college football for the Pac-12 Conference as a 12-team league. The season began on Thursday, August 28, 2014, and the first conference game was on Saturday, September 6, 2014, when USC played at Stanford. The final game was the Pac-12 Championship Game at Levi's Stadium on December 5, 2014, with FOX televising the game. The Oregon Ducks defeated the Arizona Wildcats, 51–13 for the conference championship and went on to play in the College Football Playoff. The Ducks defeated the Florida State Seminoles 59–20 in the semifinal game in the Rose Bowl, but lost to the Ohio State Buckeyes 42–20 in the championship game.

Previous season
Stanford, the North Division Champions, defeated Arizona State, the South Division Champions, 38–14 to claim their fourteenth conference title and the chance to play in the Rose Bowl again.

A record nine conference teams played in a post-season bowl game, with six teams winning. Stanford was defeated in the Rose Bowl game by Michigan State 24–20 before 95,173 fans. Arizona State, the South Division champions, was also a bowl game loser, losing to Texas Tech 37–23 in the Holiday Bowl. The only other loser in a bowl game was Washington State, losing by a slim margin to Colorado State 48–45.

Bowl game winners were: UCLA defeated Virginia Tech 42-12 in the Hyundai Sun Bowl, Arizona defeated Boston College 42–19 in the AdvoCare V100 Bowl, Oregon defeated Texas 42–7 in the Valero Alamo Bowl, Washington defeated BYU 31–16 in the Fight Hunger Bowl, Oregon   State defeated Boise State 38–23 in the Sheraton Hawaii Bowl, and USC defeated Fresno State 45–20 in the Royal Purple Las Vegas Bowl.

Pre-season

2014 Pac-12 Spring Football and number of signees on signing day:

North Division 	
 California - Feb. 24 – April 26  (22 signees)
 Oregon - April 1 – May 3  (21 signees)
 Oregon State - March 31 – May 3  (27 signees)
 Stanford - Feb. 24 – April 12 (20 signees)
 Washington - March 4 – April 19 (24 signees)
 Washington State - March 27 – April 29 (22 signees)

South Division 	
 Arizona - March 3 – April 12 (25 signees)  
 Arizona State - March 18 – April 19 (25 signees)
 Colorado - March 7 – April 12 (22 signees)
 UCLA - April 1 – April 26 (19 signees)
 USC - March 11 – April 19 (19 signees)
 Utah - March 18 – April 19 (19 signees)

Pac-12 Media poll
2014 Pac-12 Media Day was held at Paramount Studios in Los Angeles, CA on July 23–24, 2014.

North Division 	
1. Oregon (37) 	232 points	
2. Stanford (2) 	192 	
3. Washington 	142 	
4. Oregon State 	125 	
5. Washington State 	87 	
6. California 	41 
	
South Division

1. UCLA (37) 	231
2. USC (1) 	181
3. Arizona State (1) 	163
4. Arizona 	119
5. Utah 	82
6. Colorado 	43

Pac-12 Title Game Champion: Oregon (24 votes); Others receiving votes:  UCLA (13), Stanford (1), USC (1)

Head coaches

Coaching changes
There were two coaching changes following the 2014 season including Steve Sarkisian with USC and Chris Petersen with Washington.

Coaches

North Division
 Sonny Dykes, California – 2nd year
 Mark Helfrich, Oregon – 2nd year
 Mike Riley, Oregon State – 12th year
 David Shaw, Stanford – 4th year
 Chris Petersen, Washington – 1st year
 Mike Leach, Washington State – 3rd year

South Division
 Rich Rodriguez, Arizona – 3rd year
 Todd Graham, Arizona State – 3rd year
 Mike MacIntyre, Colorado – 2nd year
 Jim L. Mora, UCLA – 3rd year
 Steve Sarkisian, USC – 1st year
 Kyle Whittingham, Utah – 10th year

Rankings

Schedule

Week 1

Week 2

Week 3

Week 4

Week 5

Week 6

Week 7

Week 8

Week 9

Week 10

Week 11

Week 12

Week 13

Week 14

Championship game

The championship game will be played on December 5, 2014. It will feature the highest ranked teams from two division championships.

Week 15 (Pac-12 Championship Game)

Postseason games
Following the 2014 regular season the Pac-12 had all eight of its bowl eligible teams selected to play in a post-season bowl game. The two marque match ups will be the Rose Bowl, in which the Oregon Ducks will face off against the Florida State Seminoles in the semi-finals of the College Football Playoff and the Fiesta Bowl, in which the Arizona Wildcats will face off against Mountain West Conference champions, Boise State. Overall, the Pac-12 will see two bowl games each against the ACC, Big Ten, Big 12 and Mountain West Conferences.

For the fourth consecutive year, the Pac-12, often considered to be the second best Division I FBS (formerly Division I-A) football conference, will not play a bowl game against what many consider to be the best conference, the SEC. The last time that teams from the Pac-12 and SEC met in the post-season was the 2011 BCS National Championship Game when Auburn defeated Oregon for the national championship. The only hope for a Pac-12 v. SEC match-up was for Oregon to win the Rose Bowl, and SEC Conference Champions Alabama to win the Sugar Bowl, in which case both teams would have squared off in the inaugural College Football Championship Game. Because Alabama lost the Sugar Bowl and Oregon won the Rose Bowl, the Ducks played the Big Ten Conference Champion Ohio State Buckeyes in a re-match of the 2010 Rose Bowl.

Pac-12 team in bold:

Records against other conferences
2014 records against non-conference foes:

Regular Season

Post Season

Players of the week and honors

Following each week's games, Pac-12 conference officials select the players of the week from the conference's teams.

Position key

Awards and honors
Butkus Award
 Linebacker Eric Kendricks, UCLA
Bronko Nagurski Trophy
 Scooby Wright III, Arizona
Lombardi Award
 Scooby Wright III, Arizona
Chuck Bednarik Award
 Scooby Wright, Arizona 
Doak Walker Award

Lott IMPACT Trophy
 Eric Kendricks, UCLA
Maxwell Award
Marcus Mariota, Oregon 
Walter Camp Player of the Year Award
Marcus Mariota, Oregon 
Pac-12 Morris Trophy (top lineman)

All-Americans
Academic All-America Team Member of the Year (CoSIDA)

AFCA Coaches' All-Americans First Team:

All-Conference teams

Offensive Player of the Year: Marcus Mariota, QB, Oregon
Pat Tillman Defensive Player of the Year: Scooby Wright III, LB, Arizona
Offensive Freshman of the Year: Royce Freeman, RB, Oregon
Defensive Freshman of the Year: Adoree Jackson, CB, USC
Coach of the Year:  Rich Rodriguez, Arizona

Offense:

Defense:

Specialists:

All-Academic
First team

Home game attendance
During the 2014 season the members of the Pac-12 Conference saw nearly four million spectators attend football games at their home stadiums. UCLA led the conference with 459,901 total spectators attending the six games held at the Rose Bowl, taking the title back from cross-town rivals USC. Despite selling out their stadium in half of their games, Washington State recorded the lowest overall attendance with 184,762 total spectators attending the six games held at Martin Stadium.

Oregon and Utah both continued their respective sellout streaks as well as their statuses as the only two programs in the conference and in their respective divisions to sell out each game or record a total season average of over 100% capacity. The Ducks led the conference in sellout percentage for the fourth consecutive year, filling Autzen Stadium to an average of 106% capacity throughout the season. The only teams aside from the Ducks and the Utes to achieve sellout attendance for a game were the Arizona Wildcats and the Stanford Cardinal in their losses to USC, and the Washington State Cougars, in their losses to eventual division champions Arizona and Oregon and hated rivals Washington in the Apple Cup.

When it came to conference rivalry games played at home, the advantage was nearly split, at 4–3 (.571) with the higher-ranked team coming out on top in each case.

No Pac-12 team achieved a perfect record in their home stadium this year; the teams with the best home records were the division champions Arizona and Oregon, both going 6–1 (.857), followed by Arizona State and USC both of whom also suffered just one loss but playing one less overall game, posting records of 5–1 (.833). The single loss suffered at home by Arizona was delivered by USC; Oregon's sole defeat came from Arizona, as did the single home defeat of Arizona State, who was the only team to beat USC in the LA Coliseum.

California and Oregon faced off in a game at the newly built Levi's Stadium in Santa Clara, California, home of the San Francisco 49ers as well as the new home of the Pac-12 Football Championship Game at least until the 2016 season. The game was officially considered a home game for Cal because of the stadium's proximity to the Golden Bears' home base at Berkeley, however due to the proximity to the Ducks's home of Eugene and the large number of Oregon alumni who live in the Bay Area, the stadium was seen as a neutral location.

Washington State continued their practice of hosting a "home game" at CenturyLink Field in Seattle, home of the Seattle Seahawks, in order to attract audiences that would exceed the capacity of Martin Stadium. Unlike the match-up between Oregon and California, CenturyLink Field provided a home-field environment that helped the Cougars establish and maintain an early lead over Rutgers, however, going into the fourth quarter leading 31–24, the Scarlet Knights rallied in the fourth quarter by scoring 17 points to Washington State's 7, going on to win the game 41–38.

As for non-conference opponents in Pac-12 arenas, several marque programs were defeated including the defending Big Ten and Rose Bowl champions, Michigan State, who lost to the Ducks in Autzen Stadium, along with two wins over Notre Dame, who were defeated in Sun Devil Stadium and the LA Coliseum. All in all, the Pac-12 went 23–2 (.920) in non-conference home match ups, with the sole losses coming from Rutgers and BYU.

The conference participated in two non-conference neutral site games and split their record at 1–1 (.500). UCLA defeated Texas at AT&T Stadium, home of the Dallas Cowboys, in the Advocare Cowboys Showdown. AT&T Stadium is located in Arlington, Texas, a three-hour drive from the Longhorns campus in Austin. The other neutral-site game was the Rocky Mountain Showdown played at Mile High Stadium, home of the Denver Broncos, in Denver, Colorado in which Colorado lost to their in-state rivals Colorado State.

 Game played at Levi's Stadium in Santa Clara, CA. 
 Game played at CenturyLink Field in Seattle, WA.
Bold – Exceed capacity
†Season high

Notes
 February 5, 2014 – National Signing Day, first day when high school students can sign a NLI with colleges
 September 8, 2014 – USC football coach Steve Sarkisian and AD Pat Haden were reprimanded by Pac-12 Conference commissioner Larry Scott for attempting "to influence the officiating, and ultimately the outcome of a contest" during the September 6 game with Stanford. Haden was fined $25,000.
 October 4, 2014 – USC football team damaged the wall of the Omni Los Angeles hotel. They also put a hole in the visitors’ locker room at Arizona Stadium when the team played there on October 11, 2014.
 October 4, 2014 - Washington State's Connor Halliday sets single game FBS passing record of 734 yards in loss against California.

References